Ramalingam Chandrasekar (born 22 January 1963) is a Sri Lankan politician and a former member of the Parliament of Sri Lanka.

References

1963 births
Living people
Sri Lankan Hindus
Members of the 12th Parliament of Sri Lanka
Members of the 13th Parliament of Sri Lanka
Janatha Vimukthi Peramuna politicians
United People's Freedom Alliance politicians
Deputy chairmen of committees of the Parliament of Sri Lanka